"While You See a Chance" is a song performed by Steve Winwood in 1980, written by Winwood and Will Jennings. It was released on his album Arc of a Diver and peaked at number 7 on the Billboard Hot 100 in April 1981 and number 68 on the Billboard Top 100 for 1981.

The song was a bigger hit in Canada, where it peaked at number 3.  It reached number 45 in the UK.

The song's well-known introduction primarily features the organ – apparently, the other instrumentation was accidentally erased.

Personnel 
 Steve Winwood – lead and backing vocals, acoustic piano, organ, synthesizers, drums, tambourine, congas

Charts

Weekly charts

Year-end charts

Covers
 In 1984, DTV set the original Steve Winwood version of the song to The Sword in the Stone.
 Joe Cocker covered the song on his 1999 album No Ordinary World.
 Petula Clark on 2016's From Now On.

References

1980 songs
1980 singles
Steve Winwood songs
Songs with lyrics by Will Jennings
Songs written by Steve Winwood
Island Records singles